Brightwells Department Store was started in the 19th century by John Rumbelow Brightwell in Southend-on-Sea High Street as a drapery. This became a department store which was incorporated in 1909 as J.R. Brightwell Ltd. Its direct competitors were Keddies and J F Dixons.

John Brightwell had been an alderman of the county borough of Southend-on-Sea and twice the Mayor of Southend. The business was sold to Percy & Francis Barnes in 1925. A year later John Brightwell died at the age of 78.

The store closed in the late 1970s and the building, which had 12,200 square foot of space over four floors, was purchased for £250,000 by Ketts Electrical in 1979.Ketts Electrical closed in the 1980s after it was purchased by Rumberlows. The Store remained empty in 1980s, however a Gym opened on the 2nd floor.
The Store was home to the British Heart Foundation until 2015, when both the Gym and store were vacated to make way for a flats development called the Drapery in reference to Brightwells.

References

Defunct department stores of the United Kingdom
Department stores in Southend-On-Sea (town)
Buildings and structures in Southend-on-Sea
Department store buildings in the United Kingdom
Defunct retail companies of the United Kingdom